Javier 'Xavi' Oliva González (born 29 May 1976) is a Spanish retired footballer who played as a goalkeeper.

Football career
Oliva was born in L'Hospitalet de Llobregat, Barcelona, Catalonia. After modest beginnings (he had stints with RCD Espanyol and Valencia CF, but only with their reserves) his first professional spell was in the 1999–2000 season, as he played five matches with Recreativo de Huelva in the second division.

Oliva then represented Gimnàstic de Tarragona in his native region, in both the second and third levels, then moved to CD Castellón in 2002. With the latter, he was instrumental in a 2005 promotion to division two.

In the last two seasons, Oliva lost the starting job to former Real Madrid youth graduate Carlos Sánchez. After more than 200 overall appearances, he backed down on his decision to renew his contract and, in late June 2009, signed a two-year deal with La Liga club Villarreal CF also in the community. He made his official debut for his new team on 29 October, in a 1–1 away draw against CD Puertollano for the Copa del Rey; on 5 November, he replaced the injured Diego López during the 4–1 home win over S.S. Lazio for the group stage of the UEFA Europa League.

Oliva left Villarreal as a free agent in the summer of 2011, with no league appearances to his credit. He retired shortly after, at the age of 35.

References

External links

1976 births
Living people
Footballers from L'Hospitalet de Llobregat
Spanish footballers
Association football goalkeepers
Segunda División players
Segunda División B players
RCD Espanyol B footballers
CE L'Hospitalet players
Valencia CF Mestalla footballers
Terrassa FC footballers
Recreativo de Huelva players
Gimnàstic de Tarragona footballers
CD Castellón footballers
Villarreal CF players